Hassan Ayoub (born 4 April 1967) is a Lebanese football coach and former player who played as a centre-back.

Ayoub played in the Lebanese Premier League for Nejmeh, Safa and Sagesse, and helped Akhaa Ahli Aley win the Lebanese Second Division. He also played for the Lebanon national team.

Club career

Nejmeh 
Ayoub began playing football for Nejmeh in 1976 aged nine. He made his senior debut in the early-1980s against Tadamon Beirut, scoring the lone goal of the game. Due to limited playing time, he moved to Safa in 1986.

Safa 
After helping Safa win the Lebanese FA Cup in 1986–87, the club's first major trophy, he participated with the team in the 1986 Arab Club Champions Cup. While initially a midfielder for Safa, he was moved to centre-back.

Late career 
In 1996, Ayoub moved to Sagesse in a deal worth $100,000. He moved to Olympic Beirut in May 2002; his contract was terminated by mutual consent four months later due to a severe injury. Ayoub finished his playing career at Akhaa Ahli Aley, helping them win the Lebanese Second Division in 2002–03.

International career 
Having represented Lebanon internationally at under-20 and under-23 levels, Ayoub played for the senior team in the 1994 and 1998 FIFA World Cup qualifiers.

Coaching career 
Following his retirement as a player, Ayoub became a coach. He worked in the technical staffs of Nejmeh, Safa and Ahed, and was also part of the Lebanon national team technical staff in 2010. Ayoub also worked as a sports analyst for Qatari TV channel Al Kass, and as a banker for Bank of Beirut.

Personal life 
Ayoub and his wife have two sons: Salim and Karim. His brother, Mohamad Ayoub, also played football as a goalkeeper.

Honours
Safa
 Lebanese FA Cup: 1986–87; runner-up: 1989–90, 1990–91, 1994–95

Sagesse
 Lebanese Second Division: 1998–99
 Lebanese Premier League runner-up: 2001–02

Olympic Beirut
 Lebanese Premier League: 2002–03
 Lebanese FA Cup: 2002–03

Akhaa Ahli Aley
 Lebanese Second Division: 2002–03

References

External links
 
 

1967 births
Living people
Lebanese footballers
Association football central defenders
Nejmeh SC players
Safa SC players
Sagesse SC footballers
Olympic Beirut players
Akhaa Ahli Aley FC players
Lebanese Premier League players
Lebanese Second Division players
Lebanon youth international footballers
Lebanon international footballers
Association football coaches